Rich Robertson may refer to:

Rich Robertson (left-handed pitcher) (born 1968), former Major League Baseball pitcher
Rich Robertson (right-handed pitcher) (born 1944), former Major League Baseball pitcher

See also
Ritchie Robertson (born 1952), professor of German